Celtic Player of the Year award is an annual awards ceremony held by Celtic. It has been held every year since 2003 when Bobo Baldé was awarded the first ever Celtic Player of the Year award.

Winners

2002–03
Celtic Player of the Year: Bobo Baldé
Players' Player of The Year: Henrik Larsson
Young Player of The Year: Shaun Maloney
Goal of The Season: John Hartson - Goal against Liverpool in a 2–0 away win at Anfield.

2003–04
Celtic Player of The Year: Neil Lennon
Players' Player of the Year: Jackie McNamara
Young Player of the Year: Stephen Pearson
Goal of the Season: Alan Thompson- Goal against Rangers in a 3–0 win at Celtic Park

2004–05
Celtic Player of The Year: Stiliyan Petrov
Young Player of The Year: Aiden McGeady

2005–06
Celtic Player of The Year: Neil Lennon
Young Player of The Year: Aiden McGeady

2006–07
Celtic Player of The Year: Shunsuke Nakamura
Young Player of The Year: Aiden McGeady

2007–08
Celtic Player of the Year: Aiden McGeady
Young Player of The Year: Paul Caddis

2008–09
Celtic Player of the Year: Scott Brown

2009–10
Celtic Player of The Year: Robbie Keane
Players' Player of the Year: Aiden McGeady
Young Celtic Player of the Year: Josh Thompson
Goal of the Season: Paddy McCourt vs St Mirren
Top Goalscorer: Robbie Keane
Special Recognition: John Kennedy

2010–11
Celtic Player of The Year: Emilio Izaguirre
Players' Player of The Year: Emilio Izaguirre
Young Player of The Year: James Forrest
Goal of the Season: Scott Brown vs Rangers
Top Goalscorer: Gary Hooper
Special Recognition: Paddy Sweeney and Peter Rafferty

2011–12
Celtic Player of the Year: Charlie Mulgrew
Players' Player of the Year: Charlie Mulgrew
Young Player of the Year: James Forrest
Goal of the Season: Dylan McGeouch vs  St Mirren
Top Goalscorer: Gary Hooper
Special Recognition: Kibera Celtic

2012–13
Celtic Player of the Year: Georgios Samaras
Players' Player of the Year: Fraser Forster
Young Player of the Year: Victor Wanyama
Goal of the Season: Tony Watt vs Barcelona
Top Goalscorer: Gary Hooper
Special Recognition: Stiliyan Petrov

2013–14
Celtic Player of The Year: Kris Commons
Players' Player of the Year: Fraser Forster & Virgil van Dijk
Young Player of the Year: Darnell Fisher
Academy Player of the Year: Liam Henderson
Top Goalscorer: Kris Commons
Goal of the Season: Kris Commons- Goal against Shakhter Karagandy in a 3–0 win at Celtic Park, UEFA Champions League qualifier
Special Recognition: Fraser Forster

2014–15
Celtic Player of The Year: Stefan Johansen
Players' Player of the Year: Stefan Johansen & Scott Brown
Young Player of the Year: Jason Denayer
Academy Player of the Year: Eoghan O'Connell
Top Goalscorer: Leigh Griffiths
Goal of the Season: Kris Commons- Goal against Rangers in a 2–0 win at Hampden Park, Scottish League Cup semi-final
Special Recognition: Eric J. Reilly

2015–16
Celtic Player of The Year: Leigh Griffiths
Players' Player of the Year: Leigh Griffiths
Young Player of the Year: Kieran Tierney
Academy Player of the Year: Aidan Nesbitt
Top Goalscorer: Leigh Griffiths
Goal of the Season: Tom Rogic- Goal against Kilmarnock in a 2–1 win at Rugby Park, SPFL Premiership match
Special Recognition: Lubomir Moravcik

2016–17
Celtic Player of The Year: Scott Sinclair
Players' Player of the Year: Scott Sinclair
Young Player of the Year: Kieran Tierney
Academy Player of the Year: Jack Aitchison
Celtic Women's Player of the Year: Kerry Montgomery
Top Goalscorer: Moussa Dembele
Goal of the Season: Moussa Dembele- Goal against St Johnstone in a 5–2 win at McDiarmid Park, SPFL Premiership match
Special Recognition: John Clark

2017–18
Celtic Player of The Year: Scott Brown
Players' Player of the Year: Scott Brown
Young Player of the Year: Kieran Tierney
Academy Player of the Year: Anthony Ralston
Celtic Women's Player of the Year: Natalie Ross
Top Goalscorer: Scott Sinclair
Goal of the Season: Kieran Tierney - Goal against Kilmarnock in a 5–0 win at Celtic Park, Scottish League Cup match
Special Recognition: Scott Brown

2018–19
Celtic Player of the Year: Callum McGregor
Players' Player of the Year: Callum McGregor
Young Player of the Year: Kristoffer Ajer
Academy Player of the Year: Mikey Johnston
Celtic Women's Player of the Year: Keeva Keenan 
Top Goalscorer: Odsonne Edouard
Goal of the Season: Scott Brown - Goal against St Johnstone in a 5–0 win at Celtic Park, SPFL Premiership match
Special Recognition: Angie Thomson (kit manager, posthumous)

2019–20
Celtic Player of the Year: Odsonne Édouard
Young Player of the Year: Jeremie Frimpong 
Top Goalscorer: Odsonne Édouard
Goal of the Season: Olivier Ntcham, Celtic's second goal against Lazio in a 2–1 win at Stadio Olimpico, UEFA Europa League match

See also
List of Celtic F.C. seasons

References

Player of the year
Scottish football trophies and awards
2003 establishments in Scotland
Association football player of the year awards by club
Association football player non-biographical articles